Karl Jockum Jonas "Joakim" Bonnier (31 January 1930 – 11 June 1972) was a Swedish sportscar racing and Formula One driver who raced for various teams. He was the first Swede to both enter and win a Formula One Grand Prix.

Early life
Jo Bonnier was born in Stockholm, to the wealthy Bonnier family. His father, Gert, was a professor of genetics at the University of Stockholm, while many members of his extensive family were in the publishing business. He spoke six languages and, although his parents hoped that he would become a doctor, for a while it was his aspiration to enter the family publishing business. He attended Oxford University for a year, studying languages, then went to Paris, France, planning to learn about publishing.

First competition
Bonnier began competitive racing in Sweden at age 17, on an old Harley-Davidson motorcycle. He returned home to Sweden in 1951 after his Paris trip, and later took part in several rallies as the proud owner of a Simca.

Formula One

His racing career almost ended in September 1958 in a race at Imola, near Modena. He debuted a 1500cc Maserati and moved up through the field following a bad start, passing Luigi Musso, and was gaining on leader Eugenio Castellotti at around two seconds per lap when he lost control after another car pulled directly into his path as they negotiated a fast corner. His Maserati struck a large rock at the edge of the road and catapulted. The other driver went underneath him as he turned over and over in the air and, while he was upside down, the crash helmet of his competitor made contact with his. Bonnier's Maserati landed on its side before skidding 75 feet and heading into a ditch, where it came to a stop against a pole. Bonnier was thrown out of the car and suffered concussion, several cracked ribs, and a broken vertebra. His car was completely written off.

His greatest achievement in Formula One was taking victory for BRM in the 1959 Dutch Grand Prix at Zandvoort, when the notoriously unreliable car worked well for once (Dan Gurney and Hans Herrmann had bad crashes after brake failures). He also won the 1960 German Grand Prix with a Porsche 718, a race held for Formula Two in preparation for the rule change of 1961. Bonnier was one of the driving forces behind the Grand Prix Drivers' Association. 
Despite his win for BRM, Bonnier did not drive for many works teams throughout his career, with only one-offs as a replacement driver for Lotus, Brabham and Honda. After his debut in a works Maserati, he then drove for his own Joakim Bonnier Racing Team and for Mimmo Dei's Scuderia Centro Sud in the late 50s, before finding a spot in the BRM and Porsche teams.

After Porsche quit Grand Prix racing at the end of the 1962 season, Bonnier switched to Rob Walker Racing Team, the only privateer to have scored wins in World Championship events, where he drove Coopers and Brabhams, scoring few points.

In 1966, he reformed his own team as Anglo-Suisse Racing Team (later to be renamed Ecurie Bonnier), but his interest in Formula One gradually diminished. His last full season was 1968, in which he traded his old Cooper T86 for an old McLaren. He raced occasionally in Formula One until 1971.
In 1966, along with American racing drivers Phil Hill, Richie Ginther and Carroll Shelby, he was racing advisor to the 1966 motor racing epic Grand Prix starring James Garner. All the aforementioned (including Garner, who did all his own driving) were employed as drivers for the racing scenes. While filming the 1966 Belgian Grand Prix at the notorious and extremely fast Spa-Francorchamps circuit, Bonnier, along with more than half the field including Jackie Stewart, Bob Bondurant, Graham Hill and Denny Hulme, crashed out on the first lap of the race. According to Phil Hill, Bonnier went through an upstairs window at a house next to the track and could not take part in the later filming on the circuit.

Sports car racer

Alongside Formula One, Bonnier also took part in many sports car races. He won the 1960 Targa Florio, co-driving a works Porsche 718 with Hans Herrmann, and in 1962 took a Ferrari 250 TRI entered by Count Giovanni Volpi to top honours in the 12 Hours of Sebring, sharing the car with Lucien Bianchi. In 1963 he was once again winner at the Targa Florio, with Carlo Mario Abate in another works Porsche 718.

1964 was his best year in sports car racing, where he co-drove a Ferrari P entered by Maranello Concessionaires with Graham Hill, taking a 330P to second place in the 24 Hours of Le Mans and to a win at Montlhéry, while a 12-hour race in Reims also gave him a first place in a 250LM.
He then won the 1000km Nürburgring in a Chaparral in 1966 (with Phil Hill), his last win in a major sports car event, but still managed to snatch victories in the minor 1000 km of Barcelona at Montjuïc in 1971 (with Ronnie Peterson), and the 4 Hours of Le Mans in 1972 (with Hughes de Fierlant).

Bonnier purchased a McLaren M6B to campaign in the 1968 Can-Am series.  In the first outing at the Karlskoga Sweden GP, Bonnier had the pole but an off course excursion on the first lap caused him to finish second to David Piper in a Ferrari 330P3/4. He then ran his McLaren in five of the six Can-Am races with his best finish an eighth at Las Vegas.  He was plagued with mechanical problems most of the season.  However, he finished 3rd in the M6B at the Mt Fuji 200-mile race.

In 1970, he drove a Lola T210 to victory in the European 2-Litre Sports Car Championship, securing the drivers title at the end of the season with 48 points.

Team management, safety campaigning and death

By the early seventies, he had taken to managing his team, entering several cars in World Sportscar Championship events, and taking a backseat to driving. He had also taken a lead in the fight for track safety, which had started around that time. Nevertheless, he was killed in a crash during the 1972 24 Hours of Le Mans. On the straight between Mulsanne Corner and Indianapolis, his open-top Lola T280-Cosworth collided with a Ferrari Daytona driven by a Swiss amateur driver Florian Vetsch. His car was catapulted over the Armco barriers and into the trees next to the track and he was killed instantly. According to Vic Elford, who was driving a factory-entered Alfa Romeo Tipo 33 and who had stopped to assist Vetsch escape from his burning Ferrari, the last he had seen of Bonnier's Lola was that it was "spinning into the trees like a helicopter".

Racing record

Complete Formula One World Championship results
(key) (Races in bold indicate pole position) (Races in italics indicate fastest lap)

Notes
 – Bonnier was 6th at 1967 German Grand Prix but he was given points for the 5th place because F2-drivers who competed in the same race were ineligible to score points.

Complete Formula One Non-Championship results
(key) (Races in bold indicate pole position)
(Races in italics indicate fastest lap)

Complete 24 Hours of Le Mans results

Complete Canadian-American Challenge Cup results
(key) (Races in bold indicate pole position) (Races in italics indicate fastest lap)

References

1930 births
1972 deaths
Sportspeople from Stockholm
Swedish racing drivers
Formula One race winners
24 Hours of Le Mans drivers
12 Hours of Reims drivers
Swedish Formula One drivers
Racing drivers who died while racing
Sport deaths in France
Maserati Formula One drivers
Scuderia Centro Sud Formula One drivers
Ecurie Bonnier Formula One drivers
Giorgio Scarlatti Formula One drivers
BRM Formula One drivers
Porsche Formula One drivers
Rob Walker Racing Team Formula One drivers
World Sportscar Championship drivers
Joakim
12 Hours of Sebring drivers
Formula One team owners
Formula One team principals
Porsche Motorsports drivers